This is a list of the most common surnames in Oceania.

Australia
Statistics are drawn from Australian government records of 2007, however they may have changed.

Fiji
Statistics are based on the genealogy resources and vital statistics in Fiji during 2014.

New Zealand
Statistics are based on over 58,000 births registered in New Zealand during 2020.

See also 

 List of family name affixes
 List of most popular given names
 Lists of most common surnames, for other continents

References

Oceania
Surnames, most common